The Checker Series E were transit buses sold by Checker Cab Manufacturing Corporation from 1951 to 1953, using a body built by the Union City Body Company (UCBC) of Union City, Indiana on a chassis built by Checker in Kalamazoo, Michigan.

History
The Series E bus was designed by Transit Buses, Inc. in 1948. Transit Buses had been formed as a joint venture between Ford Motor Company and UCBC in the 1930s; buses were assembled by UCBC by fitting their body to a Ford chassis, engine, and transmission. In 1947, Ford withdrew from the transit bus market and stopped supplying chassis and powertrains to Transit Buses; Transit Buses designed a new bus using the Continental I6 "Red Seal" engine and contracted Checker to build the chassis starting in 1948, with UCBC still responsible for final assembly in Union City. Checker acquired Transit Buses in 1950 and began marketing the bus as the Checker Series E in 1951. However, sales of the contemporaneous General Motors "Old Look" buses, originally designed by Yellow Coach, were much stronger and Checker withdrew the Series E in 1953.

References

External links

Series E
Buses